John Clarke (born 10 February 1942) is a British physicist and a Professor of Experimental Physics at University of California at Berkeley.

Clarke received BA, MA, and Ph.D. in Physics from the University of Cambridge namely Christ's College, Cambridge and Darwin College, Cambridge in 1964, 1968, and 1968, respectively.

He has made significant contributions in superconductivity and superconducting electronics, particularly in the development and application of superconducting quantum interference devices (SQUIDs), which are ultrasensitive detectors of magnetic flux. One current project is the application of SQUIDs configured as quantum-noise limited amplifiers to search for the axion, a possible component of dark matter.

Clarke was elected a Fellow of the Royal Society in 1986.  He was awarded the Comstock Prize in Physics in 1999 and the Hughes Medal in 2004. He was elected a foreign associate of the US National Academy of Sciences in May 2012. He was elected to the American Philosophical Society in 2017

Honours and awards
 Micius Quantum Prize 2021
 Hughes Medal 2004
 Comstock Prize in Physics 1999
 Joseph F. Keithley Award For Advances in Measurement Science 1998
 Guggenheim Fellowship 1977-78
 Miller Research Professor 1975-76, Fall 1994, Fall 2007
 Alfred P. Sloan Foundation Fellowship (1970–72)

References

1942 births
Living people
English physicists
University of California, Berkeley College of Letters and Science faculty
Fellows of the Royal Society
Alumni of Christ's College, Cambridge
Alumni of Darwin College, Cambridge
Foreign associates of the National Academy of Sciences
Members of the American Philosophical Society
Fellows of the American Academy of Arts and Sciences
Fellows of the American Association for the Advancement of Science
Fellows of the American Physical Society